Takuya Kida (喜田 拓也, born 23 August 1994 in Kanagawa, Japan)  is a Japanese football player who since 2012 has played defensive midfielder for Yokohama F. Marinos in J1 League. He also played for team Japan in the 2011 FIFA U-17 World Cup in their run to Quarterfinals. Not only that Kida participated in the 2014 Asian Games for team Japan in their run to the Quarterfinal where they lost 1-0.

Club career statistics

FIFA U-17 World Cup statistics

Asian Games statistics

Honours

Club
Yokohama F. Marinos
 Emperor's Cup: 2013
 J1 League: 2019, 2022

Individual
 J.League Best XI: 2019

References 

eurosport.com Retrieved 2015-06-06.

External links

 
 

1994 births
Living people
Association football people from Kanagawa Prefecture
Japanese footballers
Japan youth international footballers
J1 League players
J3 League players
Yokohama F. Marinos players
J.League U-22 Selection players
Footballers at the 2014 Asian Games
Association football midfielders
Asian Games competitors for Japan